The  is a cable-stayed bridge in Finistère, Brittany, France, which spans the Élorn river where it enters the roadstead of Brest. It carries route nationale 165, the road between Brest and Quimper, and connects Le Relecq-Kerhuon to the north with Plougastel-Daoulas to the south. The bridge is named after the Iroise Sea, into which the roadstead of Brest opens.

See also
 List of bridges in France

References
 
 
 Pont de l'Iroise (1994), Sétra 2007

External links

Cable-stayed bridges in France
Buildings and structures in Finistère
Bridges completed in 1994
1994 establishments in France